The Last Vampire series (later rebranded as Thirst) consists of books written by Christopher Pike and chronicles the life of Sita, a 5,000-year-old vampire.

Publication History
The Last Vampire was published in 1994.  Sequels were originally published as numbered "The Last Vampire" titles.   The Last Vampire 2: Black Blood was published later in 1994, and The Last Vampire 3: Red Dice followed in 1995.  1996 saw the publication of three additional titles over a span of six months:  The Last Vampire 4: Phantom, The Last Vampire 5: Evil Thirst, and The Last Vampire 6: Creatures of Forever.  In 2009, the first three novels were republished in a new omnibus edition entitled Thirst No. 1: Human Urges, Fatal Consquences.  The series' new branding drops "The Last Vampire" from all titles beyond the first, listing the individual titles as "The Last Vampire," "Black Blood," and "Red Dice."  In 2010, the next three novels were similarly republished as a single volume, Thirst No. 2: Deepest Desire, Instant Remorse, identified as consisting of "Phantom," "Evil Thirst," and "Creatures of Forever." When Pike wrote further novels in the series, they continued under the "Thirst" name and numbering:  Thirst No. 3: The Eternal Dawn (2010), Thirst No. 4: The Shadow Of Death (2011), and Thirst No. 5: The Sacred Veil (2013).  On his Facebook page, Pike has shared different versions of the beginning of his next planned entry in the series, Thirst No. 6: Sita, which he intends to self-publish upon its completion.  After stating in 2016 that the story would extend into a seventh and eighth book, Pike announced in 2020 that Sita's story will end with Thirst No. 7, also to be self-published.

Books and Plot

Thirst No. 1: Human Urges, Fatal Consequences

The Last Vampire (1994)
As the story begins, Alisa arrives at the office of a man named Michael who had invited her. He identifies himself as a private investigator. She tries to find out about a guy named Slim, but her best shot is Michael's computer. 
Alisa then enters high school as a student named Lara Adams and befriends Ray. She also befriends another young man named Seymour Dorsten. She uses Ray to get information from his father's computer. She lets herself be trapped by the unknown client's men. Unfortunately, it isn't easy to escape. After learning what she can, she kills Slim and some of his crew (the rest escape in a shootout with the police).

A flashback narrates Alisa's life and explains who Yaksha is. In 3000 B.C. Sita was born in India. When she was seven years old, a disease struck her village, and most of the villagers died, including her closest friend who was pregnant with a child. A traveling priest from a different religion convinced the elders that he could drive away the disease by performing a ritual; it involved invoking a demon into the recently deceased corpse of Sita's friend. During the ceremony, the priest called forth a yakshini (demon) which killed the priest. Only a handful of the male villagers saw the demon kill the man and then supposedly vanish. But Sita, hiding in the bushes, understood that the demon had actually entered the corpse of the child, still inside his mother. Before vanishing, the demon seemed to stare straight at Sita though she is hidden behind a rock. When her father rushed to save the child from its mother's womb, Sita ran forth and stated that it is not the child that is moving, but the demon possessing the child's corpse.

Her father decided to let her choose to let the child to live or die but she was afraid and confused. He said the only way to find out if it were evil or not was if they let it live. The father saved the child and Sita decided to name the child "Yaksha", meaning "begot from a Yakshini." Yaksha grew to be a beautiful man in a short period of time, who'd always had an eye for Sita. By this time, she was grown up as well, and married to Rama, her husband, and even had a daughter named Lalita. It was about that time the men that had witnessed the long-ago ritual vanished, one after another, including Sita's father. One night, after her father disappeared, Sita was awoken by a strange noise, and upon leaving her home, was attacked and dragged away by Yaksha. He explained what he was, though the word for vampire did not exist then. Some of the men were with him, transformed as he was (though being the first, he was forever more powerful than any of them, including Sita). He convinced her to join him, threatening to kill her sleeping husband and child if she did not.

It did not take long for the civilized world to realize what they were up against, and they begged Krishna, the 6th incarnation of the deity, to intervene. His men slaughtered most of the fleeing vampires, but Yaksha and Sita survived. Krishna and Yaksha fought, and in the end Sita was given Krishna's grace under the condition that she never create another vampire. Yaksha was pardoned as well, but the pact Krishna spoke to him was unheard by Sita. Yaksha spent nearly the next 5,000 years slowly hunting down the remaining vampires and destroying them before apparently being chased and murdered by a mob during the Middle Ages. Sita lived through the ages, in Egypt first, and gradually on and toward America, until the present day setting (1990s).

Both Sita and Ray, on the run from Yaksha, figure out a way to survive the coming confrontation. Sita, sure that Yaksha is ready to die with her, sets up a trick. Bombs are put in the sitting room, with the button on Yaksha's chair (so he can kill himself, tired of his long life, and ensure that Sita goes with him). Unknown to him, Sita's and Ray's chairs sit on top of a thick steel plate beneath which are a separate set of bombs intended to send them flying high narrowly before the big explosion. Before she can set her plan in motion, Yaksha asks her what Krishna whispered in her ear thousands of years before and realizes the whole time that she was protected; Krishna had told Sita "Wherever there is love, there is my grace". Her love for Ray is what allowed her to break her vow and yet still keep Krishna's grace. When she originally became a vampire, she did so for love of her family, and therefore from the beginning she had always had Krishna's grace.

Yaksha thus decides that she was not intended to be killed to fulfill Krishna's injunction to him, and lets them go while he waits his end. Sita manages to shove Ray afar before the explosion but she was close enough to be pierced by a stake right through her heart from behind. With Sita in Ray's hands contemplating Krishna's grace, the book ends  in suspense as to whether or not she survives.

The Last Vampire 2: Black Blood (1994)
Sita is now healed for the most part, but still suffering from continual pain. She is not healing as fast as usual, after being struck in the heart by a piece of flaming wood from the explosion that destroyed her home. She hears of a group of vampires in Los Angeles that have been brutally murdering people in the area. As she is the oldest vampire now that Yaksha is dead, it is up to her to figure out what is happening.

She runs into the group, and quickly kills most of them only to find herself out-matched by the leader, Eddie Fender, whose vampiric abilities rival those of Yaksha himself. Surprised, she flees, and with Ray's help, deduces that Eddie must have found the remains of Yaksha from the explosion and used his blood to change himself.

When she attempts a sneak attack to destroy Eddie and his group during the day at their hideout, Eddie instead springs a trap on her. Ray, her lover, then lights his "fuse" and kills himself in an attempt to kill Eddie and save Sita. The explosion forces Eddie to flee, and seriously injures Sita, who is rescued from the flames by Joel, an FBI agent whom she had met earlier in the book.

Joel, unable to believe his eyes as Sita heals right there in the car, takes her to a motel, where she admits what she is, but leaves after admonishing him to never seek her out.

She finds Yaksha, who had survived the explosion, stored in an ice-cream truck. Vampires hate the cold. Though they can still withstand Antarctic-like temperatures without protection, the cold slows down the healing process and hampers their mental functions. The explosion blew off Yaksha's lower torso as it turns out and Eddie had been keeping him in a weakened state in order to continue feeding off him. Comforting Yaksha as he dies, she does what he asks; she drinks the rest of his blood, increasing her abilities far beyond what they were, hopefully putting her on a par with Eddie.

Eddie kidnaps Joel and in retaliation Sita kidnaps his mother, with whom he has a strange relationship, though her tactic fails. Eddie tricks her into releasing his mother, mortally wounds Joel, and then breaks his mother's neck. With Joel bleeding to death, Sita gives in to Eddie, who starts to drain her of her blood. As she eases in and out of consciousness and lucidity, she remembers a song Krishna once played on his flute, long ago in the duel against Yaksha. Krishna's flute could control people's emotions. Sita begins humming one of its frequencies, realizing that she could hypnotize Eddie and stimulate him to blind lust. She lures him into a freezer where she chops his head off with the emergency axe and rescues Joel, turning him into a vampire (against his wishes) and falling unconscious as the book ends.

The Last Vampire 3: Red Dice (1995)
This third volume follows directly from the events recounted in The Last Vampire 2: Black Blood. Sita regains consciousness and finds herself surrounded by the police, S.W.A.T., and higher government groups. Realizing that she cannot allow Eddie Fender's blood to fall into the wrong hands, Sita comes to the conclusion that she must burn down the entire house. She retrieves a pair of gasoline drums from the back of the house where the freezer is located and douses the entire living room in the flammable fluid. She also notes how light the drums feel as she carries them. This is the first indication of her newly increased powers. The second one comes when she finds she is able to read the thoughts of the assembled police and S.W.A.T members outside, something she has never been able to do before. Joel, who is now a vampire, convinces Sita that he can negotiate their safe release since he is FBI. Upon setting foot outside Eddie's residence Joel is taken into custody despite showing his badge, which leaves Sita no choice but to surrender in order to protect Joel – but not before she sets the house ablaze. The police are unable to put out the fire, and Eddie's body and blood are safely destroyed in the conflagration.

In the armoured van she and Joel ride in, Sita breaks free and takes control of the vehicle leading to a high speed chase in Los Angeles. Upon seeing the skyscrapers of downtown Los Angeles, Sita realizes that there are helicopters parked upon their rooftops. Struck by the idea of an escape by flight she begins to drive towards those cut-glass monoliths. In transit, Sita shoots down helicopters and, on one occasion, jumps from one skyscraper window to another hundreds of feet away – injuring herself slightly in the process, discovering that the strength of her healing factor is much greater than it was before. It is upon the roof of this second skyscraper that she comes upon the desired helicopter, the one by which she and Joel make their escape.

The escape is not as smooth as Sita might have liked, however. While their helicopter is nothing more than a businessman’s runabout, they soon find themselves pursued by Apache helicopters. Certain that they cannot lose their pursuers in their company helicopter, they quickly decide to crash it into a lake. Flying towards the nearest substantial body of water, she and Joel make a jump into the water after Sita convinces Joel that faking their deaths is the only way to avoid capture. Sita escapes, but Joel, still uncomfortable with his newly discovered stamina and abilities, rises to the surface of the lake too soon and is captured by the military. Sita decides to follow and finds Joel taken into a heavily-gunned government base. Sita meets a man from the base named Andrew Kane, and she tries to seduce him to get him to get her to Joel. She is shocked to discover he has cracked the DNA of a vampire.

After she tells the truth to Andy, he helps Sita to enter the military base. Her attempt is defeated and she is taken captive. To make matters worse, Andy confesses he is not Andy but her old lover, Arturo Evola, a brilliant priest and alchemist from the Inquisition who attempted to use Sita's blood to recreate the blood of Christ. This would, he believed, allow humanity to ascend beyond mortality; Arturo saw himself as doing God's work in offering immortality to Christendom. However, despite the high aims from which he drew his initial inspiration, he turned into a megalomaniac in the process. Going against Sita's wishes, he experimented upon their young friend Ralphe. The experiment failed, due to an alteration in Ralphe's emotional aura, and rather than the idealised hybrid of vampiric invulnerability and human purity, the boy was turned into a creature baser than either. While Ralphe possessed that same superhuman strength, he lacked all control. A vampire only feeds upon blood when needed – and can control this craving, should such control prove necessary. Ralphe, however, was gripped by an insatiable hunger for flesh. The Inquisitors went after Ralphe but Sita killed him before they got to him. However, the Inquisitors found out that Arturo had made the savage demon Ralphe, and Sita believed he was burned at the stake. Arturo confessed he turned into a vampire-human hybrid and managed to stay alive.

Sita uses her powers to incite a riot at the base and gets out of her cell, but not before reluctantly killing many of the soldiers there. Sita captures General Havor, the base commander of the base, and uses him to set off a nuclear warhead so as to destroy all the information regarding vampire DNA, as well as those samples of her and Joel's blood which are stored in the base. At this moment Arturo arrives with a legion of soldiers and prepares for a final battle. In the face of seemingly inescapable defeat, Sita – becoming, after a fashion, her own deus ex machina – discovers that the recent infusion of Yaksha's blood has imbued her with a new power: flight. Filled with the rays of the moon, Sita becomes transparent. When she tries to carry Joel with her she discovers that she cannot, indeed she cannot even touch him. The warhead explodes as she escapes, a loving Joel and contrite Arturo perishing in the blast. Sita then uses Arturo's alchemy equipment to turn herself into a human. At the end of the book, she figures out she is human and then hears someone knocking at the door. She does not answer it. Then Seymour comes to the door and is angry and upset with her for what she has done

Thirst No. 2: Deepest Desire, Instant Remorse

The Last Vampire 4: Phantom (1996)
Sita, having turned herself back into a human at the end of Red Dice, realizes she is indeed human. The man at the door from the end of the last book tries to make Sita open the door, but she is reluctant to do so. The man says he understands and will come back. After fleeing with Seymour from Arturo's home to a hotel, Sita is nearly raped by two drunks on the beach when she goes out for a late walk. She kills both men using her pistol and wanders into a nearby diner. It is there she finds herself face to face with none other than Ray, who claims that he didn't die in the explosion, but that Eddie had indeed revived him. He also reveals that he used Arturo's alchemical tools to make himself human again as well. After leaving Seymour behind, she and Ray moved to a suburb and she starts to go about normal, human life, befriending a very pregnant woman named Paula (who claims she has no idea how she was impregnated). Sita also discovers her own pregnancy as well and is stunned, but happy.

It takes little time to find out that her child, Kalika, is indeed an incarnation of Kali Ma, the Supreme Goddess of Destruction and is far more powerful than even Yaksha. The child ages incredibly fast and begins craving blood, forcing Sita to abduct a young man named Eric Hawkins and keep him prisoner at her home to give Kalika the blood she craves. Eventually, Kalika becomes very interested in Paula's child. She eventually goes to great extremes to find the child, including brutally murdering Eric and taking Seymour as a hostage to ensure Sita delivers the baby to her. Sita advises her to flee and when she is far enough away to call a certain phone number in order to speak to Sita. To save Paula's child (who Sita believes is none other than the messiah, the new incarnation of both Krishna and Jesus), Sita acquires a portion of Yaksha's frozen and preserved blood from the ice cream truck in which Eddie kept him prisoner.  The truck was being watched over by a strange homeless man with an odd grace; he believed she was going to come back for it one day.

Sita returns to the Las Vegas residence of her former lover Arturo, the alchemist, and finds a startling resemblance between him and Kalika from a picture of his that she picks up.  Sita discovers right then and there that Arturo fathered Kalika; because Arturo was a hybrid, he became the only being capable of making Sita pregnant while she was a vampire.  She also finds that Ray had not returned to her, that he was a phantom and was no longer real.  Sita "kills" Ray at his request and turns back into a vampire by once again using Arturo's alchemist equipment and combining Yaksha's blood with the blood of Paula's baby (Sita had stolen a vial of the baby's blood from the hospital). Because of the combination, she is even more powerful than before, being more or less equal to Yaksha, but is still no match for Kalika. Promising via the phone to deliver the baby to Kalika in exchange for Seymour on Santa Monica Pier. Sita, however, has been lying and does not bring Paula's child, telling Kalika that she has "come herself." After a short and fruitless negotiation, a fight between the pair ensues. Kalika stops Sita effortlessly by breaking her leg and throws Seymour into the ocean. Shortly after this, she reveals that she is definitely the incantation of Kali, overwhelming her mother with her dark power. In her thrall, Sita unknowingly reveals the phone number which she asked Paula to call. In desperation, she asks Kalika who Paula's child really is. In response, her daughter tells her that the "knowledge will cost her". Sita repeats her question, and Kalika shows her the cost, fashioning a wooden stake which she throws at Seymour, piercing him through. As Sita jumps into the water and pulls the dying Seymour to shore, telling him that she will save him by making him a vampire, Kalika leaves. However, by the time that Sita and Seymour are on land again, it becomes clear that he is beyond even her help. Believing he is a vampire due to the lack of pain he is experiencing, Seymour asks if he will live forever, and when Sita tells him out of pity that he will, he tells her he will love her for that long. She replies, "Me too," and he dies in her arms.

Sita takes Seymour's body to a funeral pyre to cremate him.  Struck by a sudden and astonishing possibility, Sita uses the remaining blood from the messiah child on Seymour and he comes back to life.  Overcome with happiness, Sita does not tell Seymour of Kalika's actions but vows to stop her daughter from getting hold of Paula's baby.

The Last Vampire 5: Evil Thirst (1996)

Sita's daughter, Kalika, has transformed into a blood-thirsty monster with power far beyond Sita's. It is Sita's task to track her down and destroy her, yet Sita still has trouble believing her daughter is totally evil. She still hopes to save Kalika, even if it means risking her own life – and perhaps the lives of everyone in the world.

The story opens as Sita and the newly revived Seymour attend a seminar of an ancient Egyptian Seer named Suzama. Sita knew her personally and is interested to know that, in her Seer's eye, Suzama predicted the birth of God in three mortal forms at exact times. Krishna and Jesus Christ were two of these incarnations. Sita learns from Dr. Donald Seter, the man who discovered Suzama's Scripture and the founder of the Suzama Society, that Christ has been born again as her friend Paula's new born son (and Paula herself is actually Suzama reincarnated). Unlike Ray, Paula begins to remember her previous life. Using her powerful powers of persuasion, Sita befriends Seter and his son James, authenticates the text, and discovers that Kalika wishes to kill the baby. She also learns that the Suzama Society was formed in order to protect the child.

Mother and Daughter are reunited over the phone and through an apparent miscalculation on Kalika's part, Sita discovers where her daughter lives. Sita goes with Dr. Seter, James, and the Suzama Society to Kalika's home. There all the Society member are brutally murdered by Kalika, despite their preparations and automatic weaponry. In the end, Sita is pushed off the balcony of the building and is grievously injured. She recovers fairly quickly, however, and by using clues in Suzama's scripture, eventually deciphers the location of Paula and her child. Sita, James, Seymour, and Dr. Seter drive to that location to discover that Kalika has already arrived and taken the child. Armed with a shotgun, Sita pursues Kalika and corners her in a small house. James arrives shortly after. Too late, Sita realizes that he is really Ory, an old enemy from her past and an agent of the Setians, a malevolent race of reptilian aliens who are after Paula's child. Ory severely wounds both Sita and Kalika, and reveals that the Suzama Society—with the exception of Dr. Seter—we all his disciples. He then escapes with the child.

Mortally wounded, Kalika gives her blood to her mother in order to save her. As she lies there dying, Sita realizes at last that Kalika never meant to hurt the child, but was only trying to protect him. She also reveals that she killed Eric (the young man from Phantom) as an act of mercy since he has been diagnosed with a terminal illness and would have suffered greatly had she not ended his life. For the first time in her life, Kalika explicitly tells her mother that she loves her, and then she dies. Later, Sita arrives at the spot where Paula's son was conceived and experiences a cosmic event while remembering her last meeting with Suzama, in which she is irradiated with stellar energy and transformed into an ethereal being. Moments later, the Setians, who also exist in the same state as Sita arrive in their spaceship to take the baby back to their homeworld, where they will consume his holy powers. Sita possesses the body of Croka, the Setian commander and is able to use him to attack and incapacitate Ory long enough to her to save the baby. After doing so, she slits his throat and the Setians, knowing they have lost their chance, quickly flee. The book ends with Sita returning the baby to Paula alive and safe.

The Last Vampire 6: Creatures of Forever (1996)
After the events of Evil Thirst (in which Sita learns that there is more strangeness to the world than Vampires) Sita now knows that Paula is the incarnation of her oldest friend, Suzama the great Egyptian Seer; Paula tells Sita that something is going to happen. Distraught, Sita asks if she will ever see Paula again, and she says no.

Leaving Seymour and Paula behind, Sita begins delving deeper into the secrets of the group of powerful beings that stalk her. Along the way she confronts another of these creatures, only to find that their time is near at hand, brought about by a centuries-old mistake committed by none other than the last vampire herself – Sita. After dispatching this foe, Sita is approached by a young woman claiming to be a friend who offers Sita the chance to set right what went wrong nearly a thousand years earlier.

Using a revamped version of time travelling which projects her mind into herself 1000 years earlier, Sita embarks on a journey into the heart of darkness and confronts the necromancer, Landulf of Capula, the architect of this evil plot who not only deceived and used Sita's power for evil before wiping her mind of the event but also now has the power to upset the balance of life itself, tipping the scales in the favor of evil. In this epic conclusion to the Last Vampire, Sita must confront her darkest fears and face an unthinkable choice: to go on as a creature of forever, or forsake her life and power for a destiny turned to ash five thousand years earlier.

She, finally tired of her immortal existence like Yaksha before her, chooses to prevent vampires from ever coming into being by projecting her mind to when she was a child, and this time she kills Yaksha instead of sparing him; she lives out her life as a mortal, meaning that all of the previous books have in effect never happened.

Still, one evening Sita leaves her home, husband and child, and waits in the night for something she cannot name or even know. When it does not come, she resumes her life. Had she not killed Yaksha in the womb, that was/would have been the time he abducted and changed her. Shortly after this, Krishna appears to Sita and her daughter Lalita and asks her if she is truly happy. Sita replies that she could not possibly be happier, and Krishna leaves her, never to see her again. The book ends as Seymour completes his work on his latest story. The reader finds that the saga of Sita, the Last Vampire, is a story written by Seymour, who is in fact dying of his HIV infection.

Thirst No. 3: The Eternal Dawn (2010)

It is revealed that the events in all of the previous books had indeed still happened, but with a crucial difference: Seymour had connected to Alisa's mind during the time of her adventures and he had literally experienced everything that happened with her and used those memories as the basis for the books. It is also revealed that Seymour, due to the great medical advancements made for HIV/AIDS patients, had never died and although he is still HIV positive, is living as a relatively healthy young man. While in Seymour's books, Sita remained in the past and never became a vampire; in reality, she returned to the present day after defeating Landulf and went on with her life. She and Seymour would finally meet in person in Book 7. It is also shown in Book 7, Sita placed a small amount of blood in his system, destroying the HIV virus—the same way Seymour had written it in his books.

Alisa discovers Teri, a long lost descendant of her human family, all she wants is to get closer to her. Knowing Teri ultimately leads to knowing Matt, Teri’s boyfriend. And as much as Alisa wants to ignore the connection she feels with Matt, she can’t stop thinking about him. That is, until she is attacked in her home by someone who is definitely not human…

Off in search of this new race of immortals before they get to her first, Alisa travels with Matt to Europe and discovers that there is more behind these immortals, and Matt, than she ever thought possible.

Thirst No. 4: The Shadow Of Death (2011)

After the events of The Eternal Dawn, Sita is living in the body of her descendant, Teresa "Teri" Raine, after she was shot through the heart with an advanced laser-gun weapon.

It is two weeks after her "death", and she attends her own funeral where she tells Seymour that she is not really Teri, but Sita.

The IIC, a powerful company with an Array, a group of psychic children and teens, that allows them to overpower a targeted person's will and force them to commit acts they would not actually do, are the only ones who can help Sita destroy the Source, the leaders of the Telar. The Telar are a race of immortals from 10000 B.C., ancient Egypt. They are going to release a deadly virus to eliminate all humans on Earth, as the Telar have had a permanent vaccine that will make them immune.

After a strange ritual with Umara, Yaksha's wife and the oldest Telar, Sita is returned into her rightful body, which had healed itself in the last week. Sita then strikes a deal with the president of the company, and uses the Array and Cradle to kill the leaders of the Telar, and uses the virus the Telar planned to release to kill the Cradle. Sita spares only the president of the company, Cynthia Brutran, and Brutran's daughter Jolie. During this epic final battle, Sita revisits what happened in between her death and awakening two days later in Teri's body, and finds that she made a deal with an ancient demon to escape from a sentence to Hell.

Thinking they are free, Sita, Shanti, Seymour, Cynthia and Jolie, and Matt quickly escape from the company's head office, which then explodes, killing the Cradle and Array.

They prepare to run away from the FBI, when Sita discovers that Shanti, the sweet and perfect Indian girl Sita rescued in The Eternal Dawn, is the traitor. She had always been the demon Tarana, who was really Lucifer, or The Light Bearer. The book ends with Sita decapitating Shanti and discovering that she was never sentenced to Hell, but in fact saw Krishna once again who gave her a choice to stay dead or return to life.

Thirst No. 5: The Sacred Veil (2013)

In her five thousand years as a vampire, Alisa- or Sita, as she was  originally called - has  experienced the equivalent of fifty lifetimes. Every moment of her immortal life is seared deep into her being. Every person she has loved, every victim she has killed-their faces are forever a part of her.

Yet, strangely, a handful of memories has been lost to Alisa. As she and her friends embark on a search for the location of a sacred artifact-an ancient veil that may hold the key to mankind's salvation-Alisa soon realizes that her own mind may be her greatest enemy.

The memories she is blocking deal with the most horrifying period in mankind's history, a time when she was tortured by a madman responsible for the deaths of millions. But what information did her torture yield?

Film adaptation
According to the Simon & Schuster author page, the Thirst (The Last Vampire) series is slated to be released as a feature film. As of September 2010, FilmNation has acquired the screen rights to The Last Vampire series.

As of April 2013, according to Pike's official Facebook page, the author has retrieved the movie rights from FilmNation and hopes to find a production company that will remain closer to his original vision of his main characters. On September 20, 2013, Christopher Pike released a statement via his fan page on Facebook. He says, Michael Preger (Preger Entertainment LLC) is very interested in "The Last Vampire" and is keen to "keep the story and the character of Sita intact." Pike says "Since completing the deal with Michael, we’ve talked at length about the film and I’m even more confident than ever that he’ll do the books justice." The deal was negotiated by Wayne Alexander of Alexander, Lawrence, Frumes, & Labowitz and Laurence Becsey from the Intellectual Property Group, representing Preger, and Ryan Nord of Hirsch, Wallerstein, Hayum, Matlof & Fishman representing the author, Christopher Pike. The deal is reported to be valued in the mid to high six figures.

References

External links
 The Last Vampire 1 & 2
 The Last Vampire 3 & 4
 The Last Vampire 5 & 6
 Thirst No. 1
 Thirst No. 2

American vampire novels
Fantasy novel series